Marie Kessels (born Nederweert, 11 December 1954) is a Dutch poet and prose writer.  She received the Ferdinand Bordewijk Prize in 2009 for Ruw.

In 1999, she received the Multatuli Prize.

Works
Kessels' novels are published by De Bezige Bij in Amsterdam. 
 1991 Boa
 1993 Een sierlijke duik
 1995 De god met gouden ballen
 1998 Ongemakkelijke portretten
 2002 Het nietigste
 2005 Niet vervloekt
 2009 Ruw
 2012 Het Lichtatelier
 2015 Brullen
 2018 Veldheer Banner
 2021 Levenshonger

Awards
 1992 Lucy B. en C.W. van der Hoogtprijs
 1993 Charlotte Köhler Stipendium
 1999 Multatuli Prize
 2001 Anna Bijns Prize
 2009 Ferdinand Bordewijk Prize

Nominations
 2010 Libris Prize

References
Profile at the Digital library for Dutch literature

1954 births
Living people
Dutch women poets
Ferdinand Bordewijk Prize winners
People from Nederweert
21st-century Dutch women writers